Wang Chongyi may refer to:

Anicetus Andrew Wang Chong-yi (1919–2017), Chinese Roman Catholic bishop
Wang Chung-yi (born 1952), Taiwanese politician